Ben or Benjamin King may refer to:

 Ben E. King (1938–2015), American singer
 Ben King (guitarist) (born 1984), British-American lead guitarist with the Yardbirds
 Benjamin Franklin King Jr. (1857–1894), American poet and parodist
 Benjamin King (actor) (born 1971), American actor
Benjamin King Jr. (1890–1956), American politician from Mississippi
 Ben Tavera King (born 1952), American new age musician
 Ben King (cyclist) (born 1989), American road racing cyclist
 Ben King (designer), American fashion designer of the 1940s–70s
 Ben King (producer), New Zealand based music producer

 Ben King, American aviator, see 1936 in aviation
 Benjamin King, Australian road racing cyclist, see Australian National Time Trial Championships
 Benjamin King (author) (born 1944), American author and military historian
 Ben King (footballer) (born 2000), Australian rules football player
Ben King, a fictional doctor on New Zealand soap opera/medical drama, Shortland Street